Kahshur-e Davud Ali (also romanized as Kahshūr-e Dāvūd ʿAlī) is a village in Howmeh-ye Sharqi Rural District, in the Central District of Izeh County, Khuzestan Province, Iran. At the 2006 census, its population was 29, in 8 families.

See also

References 

Populated places in Izeh County